Ylivieska is a town and municipality of Northern Ostrobothnia region, Finland. Ylivieska is also the commercial center of the Oulu South region, the southern part of the late Oulu province.

The municipality is unilingually Finnish. The word Yli means "upper", while the word Vieska is supposed to mean a "shallow ford".

Geography 
Other close cities near Ylivieska are Vaasa and Kokkola; the neighbouring municipalities are Oulainen, Haapavesi, Nivala, Sievi, Kalajoki, Alavieska and Merijärvi.

The town is characterized by the Kalajoki River, which runs SE–NW through the town centre. The agricultural and economical area of the Kalajoki river basin is known as Kalajokilaakso.

Ylivieska is situated along the Ostrobothnia railway, which leads from Helsinki, the national capital, to Rovaniemi in the north of the country. The railway was opened in 1886 and it has had a significant role in the town's economical development. Ylivieska is junction station with services to Iisalmi and other Eastern Finland. There are also coach services to Jyväskylä and Kajaani.

History 
Ylivieska is the home of a spreading agricultural technology called moist grain crimping, developed in the late 1960s by two local brothers.

Its church burned down on 26 March 2016.

Economy 

Employment by industry (2005)
 Services 66.1%
 Industry 28.5%
 Agriculture and forestry 5.4%
 Unemployment 11%

Agriculture and animal husbandry, mainly milking cows, used to be the main sources of livelihood in Ylivieska. In recent decades, the role of agriculture has reduced following the development of industry and services. Currently, Ylivieska is home to about 30 industrial enterprises, some of which are also internationally recognized in their respective niche markets.

Regionally, Ylivieska has become an important place for car buyers. There are several stores and agents selling new and used cars, and purchases average about 6,000 cars per year. Thus, the local car sales entrepreneurs have created the concept of Ylivieska being the "Autolaakso" or "car valley" of the Kalajokilaakso and neighbouring regions.

Culture 
The Ylivieska City Library operates through the library building, the bookmobile, the home library and the Joki Libraries online library and other offices.

The Culture Center Akustiikka is a cultural center in the town center. There is a 405-seat concert hall, an exhibition hall, a recording studio, and meeting and video conference rooms. There are many different concerts and events in Akustiikka, 15 exhibitions a year in the exhibition hall. Akustiikka also serves as Ylivieska's cinema.

The Pro Ylivieska Medal is a recognition given to a person or community in Ylivieska in recognition of merit in the field of science, sports, art or other cultural work for long-term and significant work in society or significant national achievements.

The Home Region Museum of Ylivieska features traditional countryside lifestyle, some old buildings, and as a curiosity, a 700-piece collection of milk jugs, with jugs from 15 countries.

The specialty foods of Ylivieska are maitorieska, a simple flat bread made of barley flour, milk and salt, and pepu, which has the same ingredients as the maitorieska, but instead of being formed into flat breads and baked, is boiled and pan fried.

Notable people 

Kyösti Kallio (1873–1940), the 4th President of Finland, was born in Ylivieska.

International relations

Twin towns — sister cities
Ylivieska is twinned with:
 Voss, Norway

Friendship
 Viimsi, Estonia

See also 
 Ylivieska Airfield
 Ylivieska railway station
 Alavieska

References

External links 

 Town of Ylivieska – Official website
 Map of Ylivieska municipality
 Map of downtown Ylivieska
 The Home Region Museum of Ylivieska (in Finnish)
 Municipalities and administrative regions in Northern Ostrobothnia
 Oulu South region, regional development, tourism. etc. programmes
 Kalajokilaakso the local paper (in Finnish)

 
Cities and towns in Finland
Populated places established in 1867
1860s establishments in Finland